Zaerap is a rural locality (a village) in Semizerye Rural Settlement, Kaduysky District, Vologda Oblast, Russia. The population was 21 as of 2002.

Geography 
Zaerap is located 41 km northwest of Kaduy (the district's administrative centre) by road. Bor is the nearest rural locality.

References 

Rural localities in Kaduysky District